George Tolhurst (5 June 182718 January 1877) was an English composer, resident from 1852 to 1866 in Australia.

Born in Maidstone, Kent, George emigrated to Melbourne with his father, where he practised as a teacher of music. He returned to England in 1866, and died in Barnstaple in 1877. His one large-scale composition, the oratorio Ruth, was first performed in Prahran in Melbourne in 1864, and repeated in London in 1868. Tolhurst is therefore notable as the composer of the first oratorio composed in the colony of Victoria. Though well received by early audiences, Ruth was generally derided for bathos and technical ineptitude in the musical press, and by the early 20th century was generally regarded as the worst oratorio ever composed. It was revived in a re-orchestrated and abridged version at the Royal Albert Hall, London, in 1973, conducted by Antony Hopkins and revived in another format in 2007.

Works
 1858 "O, Call It By Some Better Name"
 1864 "The Post Galop"
 1864 "Christmas in Australia"
 1864 Ruth

Recordings
2007 Ruth, Stephen Cleobury, conductor; Cambridge, Pure Sound P2007; 2 CDs

References

Further reading
Royston Gustavson, "Tolhurst, George"; "Ruth", in Warren Bebbington, ed., The Oxford Companion to Australian Music (Melbourne: Oxford University Press, 1997) 
 
 "Tolhurst family", Graeme Skinner, University of Sydney

External links
 

English composers
1827 births
1877 deaths
People from Maidstone
English emigrants to Australia
Musicians from Kent
19th-century British composers
19th-century English musicians